Toowoomba–Karara Road is a continuous  road route in the Toowoomba and Southern Downs regions of Queensland, Australia. Most of the route is signed as State Route 48. Toowoomba–Karara Road (number 331) is a state-controlled district road.

Route Description
It passes through  as Wyreema One Mile Road and Balgour Street before again becoming Toowoomba-Karara Road. It passes through Cambooya as Railway Street, Quarry Street and Alfred Street before reaching an intersection with Cambooya Connection Road (State Route 48). Here it turns west on William Street as State Route 48, soon becoming Toowoomba-Karara Road again.

In Felton it passes exits to Felton-Clifton Road and Pittsworth-Felton Road. As it enters Leyburn it passes exits to Leyburn-Cunningham Road (Tourist Drive 12) and Millmerran-Leyburn Road. It runs through Leyburn as Dove Street and turns south as Toowoomba-Karara Road. The road ends in Karara at an intersection with the Cunningham Highway.

Land uses along this road is primarily rural, including some areas of native vegetation.

State Route 48
It joins Toowoomba-Karara Road in Cambooya and follows it to Karara.

Road condition
Toowoomba–Karara Road is fully sealed. It has no incline greater than about 4%.

History

Westbrook pastoral run was established in 1841, and Eton Vale pastoral run was established in 1840 in what is now Cambooya. Felton and Felton South were the site of an early pastoral run. Ellangowan pastoral run was established in 1842, and Leyburn was settled in the 1840s. The first roads were cut to provide access to the pastoral runs and new settlements for wheeled vehicles.

In 1877 land was resumed from many pastoral runs to establish smaller farms. These resumptions included Westbrook, Eton Vale, and Felton. These resumptions soon led to closer settlement and a demand for better roads to enable the commercial success of the new farms.

Cambooya was connected by rail to Toowoomba in 1871, and quickly grew as a commercial centre. A post office had opened in 1869, and the first school opened in 1882. The development of new farms led to greater use of the road to Toowoomba.

The site for the town of Leyburn was surveyed in 1852. By 1861 the town had a post office and a police station, and the first school opened in 1862. Despite not having a railway connection the town grew quickly, with a hotel built in 1863, a court house in 1866 and a church in 1871. This placed great reliance on a road connection to Toowoomba. As settlement spread south from Leyburn it was inevitable that a road connection to the Cunningham Highway was established.

Major intersections
All distances are from Google Maps.

See also

 List of road routes in Queensland
 List of numbered roads in Queensland

Notes

References

Roads in Queensland